The Carolina Force was a professional indoor American football team based in Concord, North Carolina. The team began play in 2012 as an expansion member of American Indoor Football (AIF). The Force played their home games at the Cabarrus Arena & Events Center.

The Force is the second arena/indoor football team to be based in Concord, following the Carolina Speed which played at the Cabarrus Arena in 2007 and 2008 before moving to Charlotte and the Bojangles' Coliseum the following year.

The Force name is derived from a previous AIFA team, the South Carolina Force.

Notable players
All-league selections

 WR Jasonus Tillery

Statistics and records

Season-by-season results
Note: The Finish, Wins, Losses, and Ties columns list regular season results and exclude any postseason play.

References

External links
 Carolina Force official website
 American Indoor Football official Website

Former American Indoor Football teams
Cabarrus County, North Carolina
Sports teams in Charlotte, North Carolina
American football teams in North Carolina
American football teams established in 2012
American football teams disestablished in 2013
2012 establishments in North Carolina
2013 disestablishments in North Carolina